Arıcak, is a town of Elazığ Province of Turkey. It is the seat of Arıcak District. Its population is 3,194 (2021). The mayor is Ferit Yıldırım (Ak Parti).

References

Towns in Turkey
Populated places in Elazığ Province
Arıcak District
Kurdish settlements in Elazığ Province